Mata is a settlement in the Wadi Fira region, situated  northeast of N'Djamena. In 2009, the population of Mata was 13,739, which included 6,217 males and 7,522 females.
Mata is classified by Köppen-Geiger climate classification system as hot desert (BWh).

References

Wadi Fira Region
Populated places in Chad